Spennymoor United Association Football Club was an association football club based in Spennymoor, County Durham, England.

History
Spennymoor United Association Football Club was formed in 1904 as an amalgamation of Spennymoor Town and Weardale Ironopolis.

Spennymoor Town was itself an amalgamation of two church football teams in the town, St. Paul's and St. Andrew's in 1890. Weardale Ironopolis was a relatively new club formed in 1901 as a sporting interest for the workers of the Weardale Iron & Coke Works. The “Nops” had a short and successful history in the Croxdale & District League.

Spennymoor United spent the 1904–05 season in the Mid Durham League and secured the use of The Brewery Field the following season. The Brewery Field had until that time, been the home of the renowned Tudhoe Rugby Club and had hosted several inter county rugby matches at the ground.

In 1905, they joined the Northern League and won the league title six times in their history. In the 1936–37 season, they reached the third round of the FA Cup, where they lost to top-flight side West Bromwich Albion. They also reached the semi-finals of the FA Trophy in 1978. However, misfortune struck the club in 2005 when they folded, causing controversy over unfulfilled fixtures.

The club was reborn as Spennymoor Town, replacing Evenwood Town whose own future was in severe doubt and played at the Brewery Field albeit several leagues lower than previously. The "new" Spennymoor won the Northern League Division Two in the 2006–07 season after a late winner against Penrith for a 1–0 victory and earned promotion to Division One.

Honours
North Eastern League
Champions; 1909–10; 1944–45; 1945–46; 1956–57
Northern League
Champions: 1967–68; 1971–72; 1973–74; 1976–77; 1977–78; 1978–79
Northern Counties East League
Champions: 1992–93
Northern Premier League First Division
Runners-up: 1993–94; 2002–03
Northern Premier League Challenge Cup
Winners: 1993–94

References

Sources

External links
Spennymoor United Official Website

 
Defunct football clubs in England
Association football clubs disestablished in 2005
History of County Durham
Defunct football clubs in County Durham
Association football clubs established in 1877
1877 establishments in England
2005 disestablishments in England
North Eastern League
Spennymoor